Potangaspis is an extinct genus of placoderm fish which existed in China during the Devonian period. It was first named by Zhu Min, Wang Jun-qing, and Wang Shi-tao in 2010, and the type species is Potangaspis parvoculatus.

References

Devonian placoderms
Fossil taxa described in 2010
Placoderms of Asia
Placoderm genera